Samuel Edward Westley (born 4 February 1994) is an English former footballer who played as a defender.

Career
Westley started out at Birmingham City as a schoolboy player before joining Stoke City in the summer of 2012. He was a member of their Development Squad between 2012–14 and made five appearances for the team. In early 2014 he spent time with Ipswich Town before joining West Ham United in the summer of 2014. Westley was an unused substitute for both legs of the UEFA Europa League first qualifying round against Andorran side Lusitanos and shortly afterwards, on 31 August 2015, he joined Dutch side VVV-Venlo on a season-long loan. He made his Eerste Divisie debut for VVV-Venlo on 1 April 2016, in a 2–1 win against Den Bosch.
He was released by West Ham at the end of the 2016–17 season without having played for the club.

Westley announced his retirement as a player after being released, instead choosing to focus on a career as a sports agent.

References

External links

1994 births
Living people
English footballers
Association football defenders
West Ham United F.C. players
Birmingham City F.C. players
Stoke City F.C. players
Ipswich Town F.C. players
VVV-Venlo players
Expatriate footballers in the Netherlands
English expatriate footballers
English expatriate sportspeople in the Netherlands
Eerste Divisie players
British sports agents